Marigordiella parviginella is the only species of sea snail, a marine gastropod mollusk in the genus Marigordiella; family Marginellidae, the margin snails.

References

 Espinosa & Ortea. 2006. Avicennia, 18 : 1–83
 Espinosa J., Ortea J. & Moro L. (2010) Nuevos datos y nuevas especies de la familia Marginellidae Fleming, 1828 (Mollusca: Neogastropoda) en el archipiélago cubano. Revista de la Academia Canaria de Ciencias 21(3–4): 59–79. page(s): 65

Marginellidae
Gastropods described in 2005